St Paul the Apostle is a church in the Church of England Diocese of London in Tottenham, London, England.

History 

The community of St Paul's began around 1855 in an iron building in Northumberland Park (what is now 125 Northumberland Park). Ms Jemima Holt bequeathed some land in Park Lane and William Mumford, architect, was appointed. Construction work began in 1858 and the church, built from Kentish stone, was consecrated in 1859 as one of the "Commissioners churches".

In 1973 the building was demolished and whilst the new church and flats were being built the church community worshipped in the school hall across the road. The current building was dedicated on 20 November 1976 by the Right Revd Bill Westwood, Bishop of Edmonton.

Fr Alan Hopes, who later converted to Roman Catholicism and became an Auxiliary Bishop of Westminster and then Bishop of East Anglia, was Vicar of St Paul's for 16 years. 

St Paul's is in the Anglo-Catholic tradition of the Church of England, celebrating Mass daily.

Clergy

Incumbents

Curates

References and sources 
'Tottenham: Churches', A History of the County of Middlesex: Volume 5: Hendon, Kingsbury, Great Stanmore, Little Stanmore, Edmonton Enfield, Monken Hadley, South Mimms, Tottenham (1976), pp. 348–355.

External links 

Tottenham
Former buildings and structures in the London Borough of Haringey
Rebuilt churches in the United Kingdom
Churches completed in 1976
20th-century Church of England church buildings
Tottenham
Diocese of London
Tourist attractions in the London Borough of Haringey
Churches in Tottenham